Greg Shaw (born February 28, 1990) is an American ice sledge hockey player.

Shaw took part in the 2010 and 2014 Winter Paralympics, winning gold on both occasions.

References

External links
 
 

1990 births
Living people
American sledge hockey players
Paralympic sledge hockey players of the United States
Paralympic gold medalists for the United States
Ice sledge hockey players at the 2010 Winter Paralympics
Ice sledge hockey players at the 2014 Winter Paralympics
Medalists at the 2010 Winter Paralympics
Medalists at the 2014 Winter Paralympics
People from Cape Canaveral, Florida
People from Titusville, Florida
Paralympic medalists in sledge hockey
21st-century American people